Alsheikh is a surname. Notable people with the surname include:
Moshe Alsheikh (1508–1593), Ottoman rabbi
Ola Alsheikh, Sudanese photographer
Roni Alsheikh (born 1963), Israeli policeman

See also

Al-Sheikh (surname)
Ras Alsheikh Hamid